Empress Zheng (1079 – 1130) was the empress of Emperor Huizong of Song.

Imperial life
Zheng was born to a member of the gentry in Kaifeng. She served as a lady-in-waiting to Empress Xiang, who was the official mother of the future Emperor Huizong of Song. When Huizong was still only a prince, he lived outside the imperial palace and would often visit the empress, who instructed Zheng and another one of her ladies to wait upon him. In 1099, Empress Xiang arranged for him to marry Lady Wang. As a wedding present, Empress Xiang presented Zheng and the other lady-in-waiting, also called Wang, to him as concubines.

In 1100, Huizong succeeded his brother as emperor. Huizong was not close to his primary wife, Empress Wang and Zheng competed with Consort Wang for his favour. Zheng was apparently studious and adept at music.
Huizong had many additional favourites, including consorts Wei and Quai, several maids of Consort Zheng, and Consort Liu Mingda. However, Zheng is not described as having been jealous of them. Zheng was described as a beauty, a skillful dancer and singer, with an ability to amuse and flatter the emperor. In 1102, Huizong granted Zheng the rank of Virtuous Consort.

In 1110, two years after the death of Empress Wang, Huizong appointed Zheng to the position of empress. Her elevation was somewhat controversial, as empresses were generally members of military or official families, not former servants. The influence of Empress Zheng was also resented.

Exile
Emperor Huizong abdicated in favor of his son Emperor Qinzong in 1126. In 1127, the capital of Kaifeng was captured by the Jurchen during the Jin–Song Wars. Emperor Qinzong was deposed, and he was captured and exiled to Manchuria, along with Emperor Huizong and most of the imperial court, in what is now called the Jingkang Incident. The consorts, concubines and palace women who were captured were distributed among the Jurchen men. 
The Jurchen defined five of Huizong's consorts as wives, among them Empress Zheng, which meant that they accompanied him into exile. Patricia Buckley Ebrey states that Empress Zheng would have been too old at this point to have been considered a good war prize for the Jurchen.

Death
Empress Zheng died in 1130 in Wuguo, Heilongjiang, where the Jurchen held the exiled members of the imperial clan.

When Emperor Gaozong was eventually told of the death of Huizong and Empress Zheng in 1137, he reportedly reacted quite severely, ordering an extended period of mourning.

References

Notes

Works cited

1079 births
People from Kaifeng
1130 deaths
Song dynasty empresses
11th-century Chinese women
11th-century Chinese people
12th-century Chinese women
12th-century Chinese people